Stanley S. Love (born April 9, 1949) is an American former professional basketball player. He is the father of basketball player Kevin Love and the younger brother of Beach Boys member Mike Love. During the late 1970s, Stan was also employed as a bodyguard, trainer, and assistant to band member Brian Wilson, the Loves' cousin.

Background 
Love grew up in Baldwin Hills in West Los Angeles and was the fourth of six children to Milt, a union sheet metal worker, and Glee Love, a singer. His older brother is Mike Love. Mike, along with cousins Brian, Carl, and Dennis Wilson, later formed the Beach Boys.

Basketball career 
 A 6'9" forward, Love graduated from Morningside High School (where he was a center in his senior year), Inglewood, California, then played collegiately for the Oregon Ducks from 1968 to 1971.

Love was the 9th pick in the 1971 NBA draft, chosen by the Baltimore Bullets. He was also selected by the Dallas Chaparrals in the 1971 ABA Draft. He had also been selected in the 1970 ABA Draft by the Texas Chaparrals while still an underclassman.

Love had a four-year professional career with Baltimore, the Los Angeles Lakers of the National Basketball Association, and the San Antonio Spurs, then of the American Basketball Association. He retired from the sport in 1975, with per-game averages of 6.6 points (on 0.440 FG and 0.751 FT), 3.9 rebounds and 2.5 fouls for 14.7 minutes in 239 career games.

Love was inducted into the University of Oregon Athletics Hall of Fame in 1994.

Caretaker to Brian Wilson
In the late 1970s, Love, alongside professional model Rocky Pamplin, was employed as a full-time "keeper" to Brian Wilson, in an effort to make Brian more productive for The Beach Boys, often by physical force. In 1982, Love and Pamplin were fined $750 and placed on six months' probation for a home invasion and assault on Dennis Wilson In 1990, Love filed a petition to be appointed as Brian Wilson's conservator, partly resulting in the court-ordered severing of personal and financial ties between Wilson and his therapist Eugene Landy in 1991.

Personal life and post-basketball career
Love married in 1986. He is the father of NBA champion Kevin Love, who has played for the Minnesota Timberwolves,  Cleveland Cavaliers and Miami Heat. Love currently resides in Lake Oswego, Oregon.

References

External links

 BasketballReference.com: Stan Love
 U of O Athletics Hall of Fame: Stan Love
 Seth Davis, "Resilient Ducks". Sports Illustrated (SI.com) Jan 9, 2007
 
Carlin, Peter Ames. Catch A Wave: The Rise, Fall, and Redemption of the Beach Boys' Brian Wilson. 1st.       Emmaus, Pennsylvania: Rodale, 2006.

1949 births
Living people
American men's basketball players
Baltimore Bullets (1963–1973) draft picks
Baltimore Bullets (1963–1973) players
Basketball players from Los Angeles
Dallas Chaparrals draft picks
Los Angeles Lakers players
Mike Love
Oregon Ducks men's basketball players
Power forwards (basketball)
San Antonio Spurs players
Small forwards
Sportspeople from Lake Oswego, Oregon
Texas Chaparrals draft picks
Wilson family (The Beach Boys)
Bodyguards